Agdistis paralia is a moth in the family Pterophoridae. It is known from Spain,  France, Italy (Sardinia, Sicily), Malta, Greece, Israel, Turkmenistan, Tunisia, Algeria and Morocco. It has also been recorded from China (Gansu).

Adults are on wing from April to September.

The larvae feed on Limonium serotinum and Limonium densissimum.

References

Agdistinae
Moths of Europe
Moths described in 1847